Hanaford is a village in Franklin County, Illinois, United States. The population was 320 at the 2020 census.  Hanaford is also known as Logan.

History
Initially known as "Smothersville," Hanaford was renamed for land speculator John P. Hanaford.  In 1916, the village was renamed "Logan" for the John A. Logan Coal Company, which operated a nearby mine.  Since then, the names "Hanaford" and "Logan" have both been used by the village.

Geography
Hanaford is located southeast of the center of Franklin County at  (37.957485, -88.839177). Illinois Route 34 passes through the northeast corner of the village, leading northwest  to Benton, the county seat, and southeast  to Thompsonville.

Demographics

As of the census of 2000, there were 55 people, 22 households, and 13 families residing in the village. The racial makeup of the village was 100.00% White.

There were 22 households, out of which 27.3% had children under the age of 18 living with them, 50.0% were married couples living together, 4.5% had a female householder with no husband present, and 40.9% were non-families. 40.9% of all households were made up of individuals, and 13.6% had someone living alone who was 65 years of age or older. The average household size was 2.50 and the average family size was 3.54.

In the village, the population was spread out, with 32.7% under the age of 18, 9.1% from 18 to 24, 23.6% from 25 to 44, 25.5% from 45 to 64, and 9.1% who were 65 years of age or older. The median age was 34 years. For every 100 females, there were 103.7 males. For every 100 females age 18 and over, there were 117.6 males.

The median income for a household in the village was $46,250, and the median income for a family was $0. Males had a median income of $0 versus $0 for females. The per capita income for the village was $46,500. None of the population and none of the families were below the poverty line.

References

Villages in Franklin County, Illinois
Villages in Illinois
Populated places in Southern Illinois